Khalil Tatem (born August 19, 1997), better known by his stage name Killy (stylized as KILLY), is a Filipino-Canadian rapper from Toronto, Ontario. He is best known for his break-out single "Killamonjaro" which is certified Platinum by Music Canada, and his debut album "Surrender Your Soul" which is certified Gold by Music Canada.

Early life 
Khalil Tatem was born August 19, 1997, to a Bajan father and Filipino mother. Killy grew up in Toronto before moving to Victoria, British Columbia at 8 years old. Killy attended a majority Francophone school whilst living in Toronto, though he was one of the only children that didn't speak French. After moving to Victoria, Killy began attending a school where he was one of the only minorities, saying that he was "under-represented." Disinterested in school, Killy took up soccer in his free time and discovered rap music while attending Agincourt Collegiate Institute, eventually making it a hobby. Killy moved back to Toronto as a teenager, living in Scarborough, where he began to focus more of his time on creating music.

Career 
Killy has been rapping since 2015 and involved himself in the Toronto nightlife, quickly making connections. Killy recorded several songs in one studio session in 2015 and released them all in 2016, the only releases he made that year. He released his first song in 2016, titled Big Bux on SoundCloud and released three more tracks in 2016. The tracks gave Killy local buzz in Toronto which provoked him to record more music.

In February 2017, Killy released Killamonjaro, which went viral and was certified Platinum in Canada in January 2019. The song's popularity garnered him an interview on Adam22's "No Jumper" podcast and a feature on Drake's OVO Sound Radio.

Killy released his first studio album on March 5, 2018, titled Surrender Your Soul. The album spawned press from Complex and Pitchfork news and "No Sad No Bad" which peaked at number 65 on the Canadian Hot 100 songs.

On September 14, 2018, Killy released his first EP KILLSTREAK, which includes five songs.

On June 14, 2019, Killy released his new album LIGHT PATH 8, which includes 13 songs.

On May 28, 2021, Killy released KILLSTREAK 2, the follow-up to his 2018 EP of the same name. This time delivering a more complete project totaling 14 tracks, as well as a remix.

On September 24, 2021, Killy released KILLSTREAK 2 (Deluxe), an expanded edition of KILLSTREAK 2 bearing a total of 26 songs, including the highly anticipated DEAD FACES (ft. AJ Tracey).

On August 31, 2022, Killy released CEO which marks the first track released since he left Epic Records.

Discography 

 Surrender Your Soul (2018)
KILLSTREAK (2018)
 Light Path 8 (2019)
 KILLSTREAK 2 (2021)
 KILLSTREAK 2 (Deluxe) (2021)
 Crazy Life of Sin (2022)

Singles 
 2017: Killamonjaro
 2017: Distance
 2017: No Romance (feat. 16yrold)
 2017: Forecast
 2018: No Sad No Bad
 2018: Beautiful 00*
 2018: Very Scary
 2019: Swag Flu
 2019: Triple Helix
 2019: Drought (feat. 16yrold)
 2020: Fast Life (feat. Gab3)
 2020: Vendetta
 2020: VV's (feat. Houdini & 6ixbuzz)
 2020: Sailor Moon
 2020: OH NO (feat. Y2K)
 2021: PYRO
 2021: PYRO [Remix] (feat. Scarlxrd)
 2021: TRUST NOBODY 2021: RICK BOOTS 2021: EUPHORIC 2022: CEO 2022: Vince Carter (feat. Smiley)

 Awards and nominations 
KILLY has been nominated for the Juno Award four times. In 2019, for Breakthrough Artist of the Year, Juno Fan Choice Award and Rap Recording of the Year for Surrender Your Soul. In 2020, Light Path 8'' was nominated for Rap Recording of the Year.

Gold/Platinum certifications from Music Canada:

References 

21st-century Canadian rappers
1997 births
Living people
Canadian male rappers
Canadian people of Barbadian descent
Canadian musicians of Filipino descent
21st-century Canadian male musicians
Rappers from Toronto